Harpalus bungii is a species of ground beetle in the subfamily Harpalinae. It was described by Maximilien Chaudoir in 1844.

References

bungii
Beetles described in 1844